Weicheng may refer to:

Weicheng District, Xianyang (渭城区), district in Xianyang, Shaanxi, China
Weicheng District, Weifang (潍城区), district in Weifang, Shandong, China
Weicheng, Wei County, Handan (魏城镇), town in Wei County, Handan, Hebei, China
Fortress Besieged (围城), 1947 novel by Qian Zhongshu